Wilden Cornwall (born 29 April 1973 in Antigua) is a West Indian cricket player. He represents the Leeward Islands and Antigua and Barbuda in West Indian domestic cricket. He represented Antigua and Barbuda in the cricket tournament at the 1998 Commonwealth Games.

References
Cricket Archive profile

Cricketers at the 1998 Commonwealth Games
Leeward Islands cricketers
1973 births
Living people
Antigua and Barbuda cricketers
People from Saint Paul Parish, Antigua
Commonwealth Games competitors for Antigua and Barbuda